Red Dwarf is a British comedy franchise which primarily comprises twelve series and a feature-length special of a television science fiction sitcom that aired on BBC Two between 1988 and 1993 and from 1997 to 1999, and on Dave in 2009 and 2012 and from 2016 to the present, gaining a cult following. The series was created by Rob Grant and Doug Naylor.

The first six series were written by Grant and Naylor, while Series VII and VIII were written by Naylor with collaborations from other writers, and Series IX to XII and the 2020 special The Promised Land were written by Naylor alone. Series I and II were produced by Paul Jackson Productions (with Grant Naylor Productions taking over from Series III) for BBC North, and broadcast on BBC2. Red Dwarf first aired on 15 February 1988 and ended its original run on BBC2, by then rebranded BBC Two, on 5 April 1999 after eight series, with some PBS stations in the United States airing the entire eighth series earlier on 7 March. From 2009, Grant Naylor Productions produced new episodes for UKTV, which were broadcast on the TV channel Dave.

The series follows the fortunes of Dave Lister who is stranded three million years in the future, together with the hologrammatic representation of his former bunkmate and immediate superior Arnold Rimmer; a creature known only as Cat; and the ship's computer Holly. During Series II, the crew encounter a mechanoid called Kryten, who joins them from Series III onwards. In Series VI the Red Dwarf ship has been stolen from the crew, forcing them to travel in the smaller Starbug craft for two series. In Series VII Kristine Kochanski, Lister's former love interest, joins the crew, following the departure of Rimmer. In series VIII the entire crew of the Red Dwarf ship—including a pre-accident Rimmer—are resurrected, but the Starbug crew, along with Rimmer, find themselves sentenced to two years in the ship's brig for "abusing classified information". Series IX (Red Dwarf: Back to Earth) involves Lister, Rimmer (back as a hologram), Cat, and Kryten hallucinating that they've arrived on Earth in another dimension in the early 21st century, and Series X to XII sees the same four crew members continue their adventures back on Red Dwarf, Kochanski having departed due to Lister's descent into depression and Holly offline due to water damage. A back-up of Holly is installed in The Promised Land.

Series overview

Episodes

Red Dwarf I (1988)
The pilot script was written in 1983; the writing duo team of Grant and Naylor handed the finished script to their agent Paul Jackson who had trouble convincing the BBC to take on the series. Three years after the initial rejections, the script was accepted by BBC North West. The series almost did not happen due to an electricians' strike at the BBC in 1987 which prevented filming and thus the project was shelved. Filming eventually went ahead after the industrial action was resolved. A remastered version of this series was produced and broadcast in some countries.

Red Dwarf II (1988)
Realising that they were limited with stories based on the huge, but empty, mining ship of Red Dwarf, writers Grant and Naylor decided to go in a different direction for Series II. A small shuttle ship, Blue Midget, was designed to ferry the crew to and from different locations. The mechanoid, Kryten, appeared in the first episode as a one off. The writers had resisted using robot characters as they had considered the practice a sci-fi cliché. A remastered version of this series was produced and broadcast in some countries.

Red Dwarf III (1989)
With Grant and Naylor directly involved with the series' production (under Grant Naylor Productions) and a larger budget, they radically changed the look of the show. The opening credits sequence was changed. A new upbeat version of the theme tune played over clips from the series. A new official Red Dwarf logo also appeared at the end of the credit sequence. Starbug was introduced as the new spaceship in place of Blue Midget. The look of the series had been overhauled with the incoming Mel Bibby who had re-designed the old grey sets. Costumes were overhauled too, as designer Howard Burden brought in a new stylish look to the crew. A remastered version of this series was produced and broadcast in some countries.

There were a number of loose ends from the first two series, and changes in the third series, that were explained off by a text intro to the first show of Series III. This was done in the form of scrolling text across outer space, in a parody of the introductions to the Star Wars movies. The loose ends included the return of Kryten, Lister being pregnant, delivering twins Jim and Bexley, who grow up in a matter of days, then wind up in the parallel universe with the female version of Lister.

The regular cast changed for Series III: Robert Llewellyn came in as Kryten, and Hattie Hayridge replaced the departing Lovett as Holly. Craig Charles, Chris Barrie and Danny John-Jules remained as Lister, Rimmer and Cat, respectively.

The character of Kryten was originally intended as a one-off appearance in the series two episode "Kryten", but had returned mainly to broaden the story potential. The series was becoming difficult to write for. At the insistence of Naylor, Kryten returned to complete the team. They had approached David Ross with the intention of bringing him back to play the regular role of Kryten; but Ross was committed to the stage play A Flea in Her Ear and thus not available. Eventually, Grant and Naylor went to see Robert Llewellyn in the stage production Mammon: Robot Born of Woman, playing a robot; they saw his performance and were impressed.

Red Dwarf IV (1991)
Due to the old studio in Manchester undergoing refurbishment, the recording of Series IV moved to Shepperton Studios. The broadcast was not as originally intended; the BBC had decided to start off with the romantic story of "Camille" for Valentine's Day, while the outbreak of the Gulf War affected the series' running order, thus both the anti-war "Meltdown" and heroic Ace Rimmer's "Dimension Jump" were almost postponed.

Red Dwarf V (1992)
The series returned without regular director Ed Bye, who had agreed to direct The Full Wax, fronted by his wife Ruby Wax. New director Juliet May found it hard to work with the science fiction elements, which were much more involved and complex than in previous series and left before the series had completed. The remaining episodes were directed by Grant and Naylor.

Red Dwarf VI (1993)
The writing of Series VI was rushed, due to the fact that the BBC wanted the episodes completed as soon as possible. Grant and Naylor had originally hoped to both write and direct Series VI, but the rapid production schedule meant this was unfeasible, and Andy de Emmony was brought in to direct the series. The writers decided to make changes for the new series—Red Dwarf itself was written out, thus removing Hattie Hayridge as Holly—and the series was set entirely aboard Starbug. During the series, Rimmer would also obtain "hardlight", which would effectively give him a physical presence. For the first time in the series' history, a story arc was introduced and followed throughout the episodes, leading up to the series' cliffhanger.

Red Dwarf VII (1997)
After Series VI, co-creator and writer Rob Grant had decided to leave the series to pursue other non-Red Dwarf projects. Naylor continued with the series to build towards the often discussed movie, and expanded to eight episodes to meet US syndication requirements. To help with the expanding episode number, Naylor brought in the help of other writers such as Paul Alexander. Chris Barrie, disappointed with the hectic workload of Series VI, had decided to only take part in four of the episodes. Kochanski (now played by Chloë Annett) was brought back as a regular character.

Changes to the series itself were evident with the mix of science fiction and sit-com episodes throughout. This was an attempt by Naylor to move away from the "monster of the week" format that he felt Series VI suffered from. Ed Bye also returned to direct the series, after leaving due to scheduling clashes during Series V and VI. The studio audience was now removed from the series and, much like feature-length films, the episodes were mostly shot using one camera. Episodes were still videotaped, but were digitally processed to look like film, and although there was no live audience, a laughter track was later recorded at a screening of the episodes before an audience. The laughter track is only present on some episodes shown on the streaming service Netflix as of 2020.

Red Dwarf VIII (1999)
Having changed the look and format for Series VII, Naylor returned to the series' original roots for Series VIII. Writing the scripts himself, Naylor resurrected the original crew of Red Dwarf, along with Holly, this time played by Norman Lovett, and Chris Barrie as Rimmer. With the old cast and Red Dwarf itself now, the series returned to being videotaped in front of a studio audience, and ended on a cliffhanger that remained unresolved until 2009's Red Dwarf: Back to Earth. With 52 episodes, the series was now in a good position for international syndication and the prospect of a feature-length film increased.

KTEH, a Public Broadcasting Service (PBS) station in San Jose, California, broadcast the entire series on 7 March 1999. As a result, they broadcast the last five episodes of Series VIII before they were aired in the UK. "Cassandra" was also broadcast on other PBS stations on that date, as well.

Red Dwarf: Back to Earth (2009)

In 2009, UKTV channel Dave screened three new 25-minute specials to celebrate the 21st anniversary of the show. The new episodes form part of an effort by Dave to screen more original programming, instead of just repeats. The specials were made up of a three-part story, "Back to Earth", as well as a "Making-of" special. Originally, there were to be two episodes, a "Making-of" and a live show titled Red Dwarf: Unplugged. However, according to Robert Llewellyn on Twitter, the Live Show had been cancelled due to time and money, and that there would be three episodes instead. As with series 7, these episodes were not filmed in front of a live studio audience; however, unlike the seventh series, it was not shown to an audience at a later date to record the audience laughter.

Red Dwarf X (2012)

Red Dwarf returned for its first full series since 1999 in October 2012 for six new episodes written by Doug Naylor filmed before a live audience. It was released on DVD and Blu-ray on 19 November 2012. All four original cast members from Back to Earth reprised their roles.

Red Dwarf XI (2016)
It was confirmed on 2 May 2015 that an eleventh and twelfth series of Red Dwarf (consisting of six episodes each) would be filmed in late 2015 and early 2016 for Dave. After the announcement, Craig Charles resigned his role on Coronation Street to focus on filming for both new series. Red Dwarf XI began broadcast in September 2016.

Red Dwarf XII (2017)
Filming on Red Dwarf XII began in early 2016.

Red Dwarf: The Promised Land (2020)

UKTV announced in October 2019 that a feature-length special would see production, to air in 2020.

Unproduced scripts

"Bodysnatcher"

Originally to be the second episode of Series I, and would have involved Rimmer going insane trying to deal with his intangibility and attempting to build himself a new body by stealing parts of Lister's, and Lister trying to live with a hologram of himself. The former idea was, in a way, used in the episode "Bodyswap" in Series III, and the latter became the basis for "Me2" (with the plotline transferred from Lister to Rimmer), which filled the sixth spot in the first series after "Bodysnatcher" was dropped.

"Dad"
"Dad" was planned as the first episode of the show's third series, intended to be a direct continuation of the preceding episode, "Parallel Universe", the final episode of the second series. It was never filmed or even fully scripted; writers Rob Grant and Doug Naylor abandoned it halfway through writing it. Instead, a comically fast Star Wars opening crawl provided exposition for the episode "Backwards", which became the new Series III premiere.

An extract of the unfinished script of "Dad" was included on the DVD release Red Dwarf: The Bodysnatcher Collection alongside several other such extracts. In the same style as the eponymous "lost episode" "Bodysnatcher", the extract of "Dad" was animated in a storyboard style as the script itself was read by lead actor Chris Barrie (who, being a skilled impressionist, supplied the voices of all the characters).

In "Parallel Universe", Lister had slept with a female version of himself while in a parallel dimension and learned that he was pregnant, since in that particular dimension it is the men who bear children. "Dad" was to primarily deal with Lister's pregnancy, why former guest character Kryten had reappeared and become a regular member of the cast and what had happened to him, and why Holly's image had changed from a male to a female. The released script extract shows that "Dad" would not have followed the pre-credits sequence of "Backwards" to the letter. For example, Lister would not have been pregnant with twins: instead he would give birth to a single son. Also, apparently Lister would have rebuilt Kryten while "heavily pregnant", and not "shortly afterwards" as the pre-title "Backwards" scroll suggests. Additionally, unless male Holly actor Norman Lovett was to make a guest appearance in the episode it is likely that Holly would have first appeared as a female at the very beginning of the episode.

The script was ultimately rejected by the show's writers and producers, Rob Grant and Doug Naylor, who felt that the script was not as funny as previous episodes. In The Red Dwarf Programme Guide, Chris Howarth and Steve Lyons write that another reason "Dad" was rejected was because it was possibly sexist.

Jokes from the script were worked into other episodes. For example, Lister's revealing that he was abandoned at birth and Rimmer's subsequent speculation that Lister was the product of brother-sister incest was written into the episode "The Last Day".

"Identity Within"

This episode was going to be in Series VII but was replaced by "Duct Soup" for budgetary reasons. A reconstructed version of the episode (read by Chris Barrie) appears on the Series VII DVD release.
The Cat is fatally ill, with only one cure: he has to have sex. They travel to a GELF village, where a female cat called Aura is being held prisoner for auction. Lister, Rimmer and Kryten have to save Aura and get her to fall in love with the Cat before he dies from being a virgin. These events are loosely revisited in the Series XI finale "Can of Worms" where it's revealed that the Cat is a virgin and ends up losing his virginity to a Polymorph disguised as a fellow cat.

Feature film
Once Series VIII ended in 1999, Doug Naylor attempted to make a feature-length version of the show. A script was written, by Naylor, and flyers began circulating around certain websites. The flyer outlined the movie's plot, set in the distant future where Homo Sapienoids—a fearsome flesh-machine hybrid race—had taken over the solar system and were wiping out the human race. Spaceships that tried to escape Earth were hunted down until only one remained... Red Dwarf. Pre-production began in 2004 and filming was planned for 2005. However, sufficient funding was not forthcoming and production was put on hold.

American pilots
 See Red Dwarf#U.S. version
Two versions of a pilot episode for a proposed NBC version of Red Dwarf were produced in 1992—a complete episode and a partial episode with different cast members. Neither version aired, though excerpts from the first pilot appeared on the Red Dwarf V DVD set.

References

Bibliography

External links

 
 
 

 
Lists of British science fiction television series episodes
Lists of British sitcom episodes